Andrew Schacht (born 22 May 1973 in Adelaide) is a male beach volleyball player from Australia.

He represented Australia at the 2004 Summer Olympics, and the 2008 Summer Olympics, with teammate Joshua Slack.

Schacht was originally an indoor volleyball player and then converted to beach volleyball in 1996. Schacht first competed in the Olympic Games at Athens in 2004. Schacht and his partner Joshua Slack reached the round of sixteen in Athens, and they combined again in Beijing in 2008 where they finished ninth.

References

External links
 
 
 
 

1973 births
Living people
Australian men's beach volleyball players
Beach volleyball players at the 2004 Summer Olympics
Beach volleyball players at the 2008 Summer Olympics
Olympic beach volleyball players of Australia
People from Adelaide
Australian people of German descent